The List of shipwrecks in 1752 includes some ships sunk, wrecked or otherwise lost during 1752.

January

3 January

11 January

15 January

16 January

20 January

28 January

Unknown date

February

1 February

17 February

18 February

26 February

Unknown date

March

Unknown date

April

15 April

Unknown date

May

15 May

Unknown date

July

6 July

20 July

30 July

August

9 August

Unknown date

September

15 September

17 September

22 September

Unknown date

October

4 October

23 October

24 October

28 October

31 October

Unknown date

November

2 November

10 November

15 November

19 November

Unknown date

December

2 December

23 December

24 December

Unknown date

Unknown date

References

1752